The Women's keirin at the 2013 UCI Track Cycling World Championships was held on February 24. 17 athletes participated in the contest. After the 3 qualifying heats, the fastest two riders in each heat advanced to the second round. The riders that did not advance to the second round, raced in 2 repechage heats. The fastest 3 riders in each heat advanced to the second round along with the 6 that qualified before.

The first 3 riders from each of the 2 Second Round heats advanced to the Final and the remaining riders raced a consolation 7–11 final.

Medalists

Results

First round
The heats were held at 11:00.

Heat 1

Heat 2

Heat 3

First Round Repechage
The heats were held at 11:50.

Heat 1

Heat 2

Second round
The heats were held at 15:10.

Heat 1

Heat 2

Finals
The finals were held at 16:35.

Small Final

Final

References

2013 UCI Track Cycling World Championships
UCI Track Cycling World Championships – Women's keirin
UCI